Mesocarb (brand names Sidnocarb, Sydnocarb) is a drug that is currently being developed for Parkinson's disease.

The drug was originally developed in the USSR in the 1970s  for a variety of indications including asthenia, apathy, adynamia and some clinical aspects of depression and schizophrenia.  Mesocarb was used for counteracting the sedative effects of benzodiazepine drugs, increasing workload capacity and cardiovascular function, treatment of ADHD and hyperactivity in children, as a nootropic, and as a drug to enhance resistance to extremely cold temperatures. It is also listed as having antidepressant and anticonvulsant properties.
 
The drug has been found to act as a selective dopamine reuptake inhibitor by blocking the actions of the dopamine transporter (DAT), and lacks the dopamine release characteristic of stimulants such as  dextroamphetamine.  It was the most selective DAT inhibitor amongst an array of other DAT inhibitors to which it was compared.

Mesocarb was sold in Russia as 5 milligram tablets under the brand name Sydnocarb. Hydroxylated metabolites can be detected in urine for up to 10 days after consumption.

The drug is almost unknown in the western world and is neither used in medicine nor studied scientifically to any great extent outside Russia and other countries in the former Soviet Union. It has however been added to the list of drugs under international control and is a scheduled substance in most countries, despite its multiple therapeutic applications and reported lack of significant abuse potential.

Mesocarb had erroneously been referred to as a prodrug of amphetamine but this was based on older literature that relied on gas chromatography as an analytical method.  Subsequently, with the advent of mass spectroscopy, it has been shown that presence of amphetamine in prior studies was an artifact of gas chromatography method. More recent studies using mass spectroscopy show that negligible levels of amphetamine are released from mesocarb metabolism.

Chemistry
Mesocarb is a mesoionic sydnone imine. It has the amphetamine-backbone present, except that the RN has a complicated imine side-chain present.

Preparation

References 

Dopamine reuptake inhibitors
Oxadiazoles
Prodrugs
Russian drugs
Stimulants
Ureas
Drugs in the Soviet Union